Muhammad Ali and Rudie Lubbers fought a twelve-round boxing match in Jakarta on October 20, 1973. Ali dominated the fight and won the bout through a unanimous decision on points.

The Ali-Lubbers fight is notable for the interview Ali gave to Reg Gutteridge during the interval between rounds of the televised bout with Gutteridge leaning through the ropes of the ring. This is believed to be the only interview of its kind.

References

Lubbers
1973 in boxing
Sport in Jakarta
Boxing in Indonesia
October 1973 sports events in Asia